The following is a partial list of the "A" codes for Medical Subject Headings (MeSH), as defined by the United States National Library of Medicine (NLM).

This list continues the information at List of MeSH codes (A09). Codes following these are found at List of MeSH codes (A11). For other MeSH codes, see List of MeSH codes.

The source for this content is the set of 2006 MeSH Trees from the NLM.

– tissues

– connective tissue
  – adipose tissue
  – abdominal fat
  – intra-abdominal fat
  – subcutaneous fat, abdominal
  – brown fat
  – subcutaneous fat
  – subcutaneous fat, abdominal
  – bone and bones
  – bone matrix
  – bony callus
  – haversian system
  – periosteum
  – cartilage
  – elastic cartilage
  – fibrocartilage
  – triangular fibrocartilage
  – hyaline cartilage
  – elastic tissue
  – granulation tissue
  – cicatrix
  – subcutaneous tissue

– epithelium
  – basement membrane
  – bruch membrane
  – endothelium
  – endothelium, corneal
  – endothelium, lymphatic
  – endothelium, vascular
  – pericytes
  – tunica intima
  – epidermis
  – hair follicle
  – epithelium, corneal
  – pigment epithelium of eye
  – seminiferous epithelium
  – urothelium

– exocrine glands
  – bartholin's glands
  – bulbourethral glands
  – lacrimal apparatus
  – mammary glands, animal
  – mammary glands, human
  – pancreas, exocrine
  – prostate
  – salivary glands
  – parotid gland
  – salivary ducts
  – salivary glands, minor
  – sublingual gland
  – submandibular gland
  – sebaceous glands
  – meibomian glands
  – sweat glands
  – apocrine glands
  – eccrine glands

– lymphoid tissue
  – adenoids
  – bursa of fabricius
  – germinal center
  – dendritic cells, follicular
  – lymph nodes
  – germinal center
  – dendritic cells, follicular
  – peyer's patches
  – spleen
  – thymus gland
  – tonsil

– membranes
  – basement membrane
  – basilar membrane
  – bruch membrane
  – descemet membrane
  – glomerular basement membrane
  – extraembryonic membranes
  – allantois
  – amnion
  – chorioallantoic membrane
  – chorion
  – chorionic villi
  – yolk sac
  – mucous membrane
  – gastric mucosa
  – chief cells, gastric
  – enterochromaffin cells
  – gastrin-secreting cells
  – parietal cells, gastric
  – somatostatin-secreting cells
  – intestinal mucosa
  – enterocytes
  – goblet cells
  – paneth cells
  – mouth mucosa
  – respiratory mucosa
  – laryngeal mucosa
  – goblet cells
  – nasal mucosa
  – goblet cells
  – olfactory mucosa
  – olfactory receptor neurons
  – serous membrane
  – pericardium
  – peritoneum
  – pleura

– Muscles
  – muscle, skeletal
  – sarcoplasmic reticulum
  – muscle, smooth
  – muscle, smooth, vascular
  – tunica media
  – myometrium
  – myocardium

– nerve tissue
  – ependyma
  – myelin sheath
  – neurilemma
  – ranvier's nodes
  – neurilemma

– organoids

– surgically created structures
  – colonic pouches
  – skeletal muscle ventricle
  – stomas
  – surgical flaps
  – urinary reservoirs, continent

The list continues at List of MeSH codes (A11).

A10